Mucu may refer to:
Muçu, Azerbaijan
Mücü, Azerbaijan
MUCU, the ICAO airport code of Antonio Maceo Airport, in Santiago de Cuba